Liv Jensen was a Norwegian luger who competed in the late 1930s. She won a silver medal in the women's singles event at the 1937 European luge championships in Oslo, Norway.

References
List of European luge champions 

Norwegian female lugers
Year of birth missing
Year of death missing